Absurda Cenicienta (Absurd Cinderella) is the fourth studio album by the Spanish artist Chenoa. It has been released on October 9, 2007, in Spain. This time, Chenoa has written and/or co-written every single track on the album, that continues with the pop/rock direction started with Nada es Igual.

The album was certified Platinum in Spain, and Gold in Ecuador. It was nominated in the XII Music Awards like Best Pop Album. The lead single Todo Irá Bien won Best Latin Song in the Orgullosamente Latino 2008 awards, that took place in Mexico. With Absurda Cenicienta Chenoa started her international career, and made a huge tour throughout Latin America and United States.

Track listing
 "Todo Irá Bien"
 "El bolsillo del Revés"
 "Absurda Cenicienta" (Shortcut to Heaven)
 "Sonríeme si eres tú"
 "Algo de los Dos"
 "Mucho Rodaje"
 "Vive tu Vida"
 "Dieciséis"
 "Ayúdame"
 "Cita a Ciegas"
 "Hola como te va" 
 "Para Sentirte"

Album chart performance
Absurda Cenicienta debuted in the 2nd position in the Spanish album chart, achieving Gold status in its first week due to the 40,000 copies shipped. The album had a good chart run and sold Platinum after many weeks. Absurda Cenicienta topped the charts in Costa Rica for a month, charting in the Top10 for many weeks. In Ecuador, Chenoa's music had a great success (as well as in other Latin American countries). Her singles went straight to the top while the album ended in the 8th position in the Ecuatorian Annual Albums Chart 2008.

Single sales

Singles

Todo Irá Bien
Todo Irá Bien is the first single from the album, the video was shot in a factory from Barcelona in October 2007. In it, Chenoa looks very happy, dancing and flying by moments because of her happiness. The song tries to give a positive message, and was a very successful single in Spain and all Latin America. The song won Best Latin Song category in the Orgullosamente Latino 2008 awards, that took place in Mexico.

El bolsillo del revés
El bolsillo del revés is the second single from Absurda Cenicienta In Spain, and the third one in Latin America. The music video shows Chenoa dancing and moving into a small flat, criticizing how much cost to buy a flat and to become independent specially for young people. The song had a good airplay specially in Costa Rica in early 2009.

Absurda Cenicienta 
Absurda Cenicienta (Shortcut to Heaven) is the third single released in Spain, and the second one in America. The single release was followed by a media tour all over America. The video was shot in June 2008 during three days, in a monastery of the Mexico City suburbs, under the direction of Manuel Escalante.

Volverte a ver
Volverte a ver is the original soundtrack and the lead single chosen to promote the film with the same title. The film starred Alfonso Herrera former member of RBD. Chenoa shot the video in November 2008 while the film premiered on 25 December of the same year. The O.S.T was the 5th best selling soundtrack in the Mixup mega stores, and it entered the Mexican Top 100 albums chart.

2007 albums
Chenoa albums
Universal Music Spain albums